Landesbergen is a former Samtgemeinde ("collective municipality") in the district of Nienburg, in Lower Saxony, Germany. Its seat was in the village Landesbergen. At the 1 November 2011 local government reform, the Samtgemeinde Landesbergen and the municipality Stolzenau formed the new Samtgemeinde Mittelweser.

The Samtgemeinde Landesbergen consisted of the following municipalities:
 Estorf 
 Husum 
 Landesbergen
 Leese

Former Samtgemeinden in Lower Saxony